Niall Morris (born 1965) is an Irish classical singer and producer.

Biography
Born in Dublin, he studied music at Trinity College Dublin and the Guildhall School of Music and Drama, London. He completed his studies at the National Opera Studio in London.

He performed principally with English Touring Opera and the D'Oyly Carte Opera Company. Amongst the opera roles he has performed on stage are Nemorino in L'elisir d'amore, Davey in Jonathan Dove's Siren Song, Ralph Rackstraw in H.M.S. Pinafore, Don Ottavio in Don Giovanni, Lysander in A Midsummer Night's Dream, Fenton in The Merry Wives of Windsor, Paris in La Belle Hélène, and Antonio in The Duenna. He created the tenor roles in Thomas Adès first opera Powder Her Face, which was released on EMI Classics and nominated for a Grammy (Best Opera Recording 2000).

Morris was a founding member of the Irish singing group "The Celtic Tenors" who won the German Echo Klassik Award for Best Classical Crossover Artists in 2002. The group and made numerous recordings, notably at Abbey Road studios while signed to EMI Classics. Morris decided to leave the group in 2006, partly due to creative differences, and since then has worked as company manager for Opera Ireland as well as creating a biographical stage show about the life of opera legend Maria Callas which played for eleven nights at the National Concert Hall, Dublin.

He also moved into opera directing in 2009. His production of Puccini's La bohème at Loughcrew Garden Opera was followed by a staging of La traviata starring Claudia Boyle and a reworking of Die Fledermaus. In 2015 Morris created a new stage show, The Puccini Scandal – an opera drama – which investigates the personal and artistic dilemmas of the great opera composer after the death of the maid Doria Manfredi. Niall Morris plays the role of Giacomo Puccini.

Sources
Lynch, Donal (24 February 2008) New notes on an old friend. The Independent (Ireland), .
O'Riordan, Dick (15 November 2015). "Puccini scandal was the stuff of tragic opera". The Sunday Business Post
Morris, Niall (2 January 2017). "Scandalous secret of the opera master". The Independent (Ireland)
Brankin, Una (10 November 2014). "How singing star Niall Morris fell for the story of a very special girl called Maria Callas". Belfast Telegraph

External links
 

1975 births
Irish operatic tenors
Living people
Opera crossover singers
People educated at Wesley College, Dublin
20th-century Irish male singers
21st-century Irish male singers
Singers from Dublin (city)
Alumni of Trinity College Dublin
Alumni of the Guildhall School of Music and Drama